The 1916 Massillon Tigers football season  was their seventh season in existence. The team posted a 7-1-2 record in 1916.

Schedule

Game notes

References

Pro Football Archives: 1916 Massillon Tigers

Massillon Tigers seasons
1916 in sports in Ohio
Massillon Tigers